Blapsium is an extinct genus of beetles from the Middle Jurassic period. The only described species is B. egertoni, and samples have only been found at the Taynton Limestone Formation, also known as the Stonesfield Slate.

Blapsium was referred to Ommatidae (considered in the paper to be a subfamily of Cupedidae) in 2020.

Sources 

Ommatidae
Prehistoric beetle genera
Middle Jurassic insects
Prehistoric insects of Europe
Taxa named by John O. Westwood
Fossil taxa described in 1854